Torquatus, masculine (torquata, feminine; torquatum, neuter), is a Latin word meaning "adorned with a neck chain or collar" and may refer to:

People
Lucius Manlius Torquatus
Titus Manlius Torquatus (235 BC)
Silanus
Marcus Junius Silanus Torquatus (consul AD 19)
Marcus Junius Silanus Torquatus (consul AD 46)
Lucius Junius Silanus Torquatus
Decimus Junius Silanus Torquatus
Titus Manlius Torquatus (consul 299 BC)
Titus Manlius Torquatus (347 BC)
St. Torquatus of Acci

Animals

Reptiles
Collared delma (Delma torquata)
Night snake (Hypsiglena torquata)
Amazon lava lizard (Tropidurus torquatus)
Wiegmann's crevice swift (Sceloporus torquatus)

Birds
Stripe-headed brush-finch (Arremon torquatus)
Collared titi (Callicebus torquatus)
Ringed woodpecker (Celeus torquatus)
Collared crow (Corvus torquatus)
Ringed antpipit (Corythophis torquatus)
Collared tuco-tuco (Ctenomys torquatus)
Barred rail (Gallirallus torquatus)
White-tailed shrike (Lanioturdus torquatus)
Black-collared barbet (Lybius torquatus)
Ornate melidectes (Melidectes torquatus)
Collared redstart (Myioborus torquatus)
Black-collared bulbul (Neolestes torquatus)
Rufous-winged antshrike (Thamnophilus torquatus)
African stonechat (Saxicola torquatus)
Ring ouzel (Turdus torquatus)

Mammals
Necklace pipistrelle (Arielulus torquatus)
Collared mangabey (Cercocebus torquatus)
Hairless bat (Cheiromeles torquatus)
Arctic lemming (Dicrostonyx torquatus)
Maned three-toed sloth (Bradypus torquatus)

Insects
Torquatus swallowtail (Papilio torquatus)

Plants
Bulbophyllum torquatum, a species of orchid